Eukaryotic translation initiation factor 3 subunit E (eIF3e) is a protein that in humans is encoded by the EIF3E gene.

Interactions 

EIF3S6 has been shown to interact with:

 BAT2, 
 COPS6 
 CSN3,
 EIF3A,  and
 TRIM27.

See also 
Eukaryotic initiation factor 3 (eIF3)

References

Further reading